Punta Indio Partido is a partido on the Atlantic coast of Buenos Aires Province in Argentina.

It was created in 1994, as an excision from the old Magdalena Partido.

Settlements

Alvarez Jonte, population 40
Pipinas, population 1,020
Verónica, population 5,772
Punta Indio, population 666

External links

Municipal Website
 puntaindioweb.com.

1994 establishments in Argentina
Partidos of Buenos Aires Province